Ryan Michael Hewitt (born January 24, 1991) is a former American football tight end and fullback. He played college football at Stanford and was signed by the Cincinnati Bengals as an undrafted free agent in 2014.

College career
Hewitt played college football at Stanford University from 2009 to 2013. He finished his collegiate career with 59 receptions for 473 yards and six touchdowns.

Professional career

Cincinnati Bengals
Hewitt was signed by the Cincinnati Bengals after going undrafted in the 2014 NFL Draft.
He won a training camp battle with veteran fullback John Conner to secure a spot on the Bengals final roster.

Hewitt had 10 receptions for 86 yards during his rookie season, and finished eighth in Pro Football Focus's lead blocker rankings. He has established himself as a versatile weapon for Cincinnati, playing the H-back position and blocking for running plays while also catching passes out of the backfield and from the tight end position.

On September 1, 2018, Hewitt was released by the Bengals as a part of final roster cuts before the start of the 2018 season.

Indianapolis Colts
On September 3, 2018, Hewitt was signed by the Indianapolis Colts.

Tennessee Titans
On June 13, 2019, Hewitt signed with the Tennessee Titans. He was released on August 31, 2019.

References

External links
Cincinnati Bengals bio
Stanford Cardinal bio

1991 births
Living people
Players of American football from Denver
American football tight ends
American football fullbacks
Stanford Cardinal football players
Cincinnati Bengals players
Indianapolis Colts players
Tennessee Titans players